Penicillium shennonghianum is a species of fungus in the genus Penicillium.

References

shennonghianum
Fungi described in 1988